Stroud Lake is a reservoir in Creek County, Oklahoma, United States, about  from Stroud, Oklahoma. According to AnglerHub, the lake was built in 1968.

The lake was formally named "Salt Camp Creek Watershed Dam No. 12" when it was under construction.  The project was built by the City of Stroud and the Creek County Conservation District, 
assisted by the Oklahoma Conservation Commission and the USDA Natural Resources Conservation Service (NRCS) Watershed Protection and Flood Prevention Program.

Lake description
The lake was built primarily to serve the following functions: water supply, flood control and recreation.

Notes

References

External links 
Stroud Lake

1968 establishments in Oklahoma
Reservoirs in Oklahoma 
Geography of Creek County, Oklahoma